Hosmer Mountain Soda is a small soft drink producer based in eastern Connecticut.  Hosmer Mountain Bottling Company was founded in 1912 as a spring water delivery service in the hamlet of Willimantic. and purchased in 1958 by Arthur J. Potvin; who made his soda flavors all by trial and error.  Hosmer Mountain Soda has two locations in Connecticut, at 217 Mountain St. in Willimantic and one at 15 Spencer Street in Manchester.

History of Owners 

1912-1922: W.E. Clark
1923-1944: Abraham Beller
1945-1957: Fred Meyer
1958–Present: Arthur J. Potvin and his four sons Bill, John, Andy and Chuck

Flavors 

Hosmer makes about 35 Flavors including Diets, Seltzers and a line of "Antique Sodas" made with cane sugar. They feature all of the classic flavors of the New England Independent bottlers, such as Root Beer, Birch Beer, Cream Soda, Sarsaparilla and Lime Rickey. Other sodas include unique offerings such as Peach, Strawberry and Cranberry, Cocoa Cream and (cane sugar) Ginger Beer.

Glass Bottles Only 

Hosmer uses two sizes of reusable glass bottles (28 & 12 oz.) to package their products, which are then returned  by customers, cleaned and refilled, in keeping with the company's long standing green mission. Hosmer Mountain has charged a deposit since before the CT State Bottle Bill required it of soft drink manufacturers.

External links 
Hosmer Mountain Soda

Drink companies of the United States
Companies based in Windham County, Connecticut
American soft drinks
1912 establishments in Connecticut 
American companies established in 1912
Food and drink companies established in 1912
Food and drink companies based in Connecticut